Raleigh Electric Company Power House, also known as the Carolina Power and Light Power House, is a historic power station located at Raleigh, North Carolina. It was built in 1910, and is a triparte, gable-front steel framed common bond brick building.  It consists of two original two-story blocks and a one-story replacement block built in 1930. It was originally built to power Raleigh's electric street car system.

It was listed on the National Register of Historic Places in 1997.

References 

Industrial buildings and structures on the National Register of Historic Places in North Carolina
Industrial buildings completed in 1910
Buildings and structures in Raleigh, North Carolina
National Register of Historic Places in Raleigh, North Carolina